Lieutenant General Pieter Andries Le Grange  (born 15 September 1916) was a South African Air Force officer, who served as Chief of Staff Personnel from 1974 to 1977.

Air Force career 
Le Grange joined the South African Air Defence Force in 1937 and participated in the Second World War by serving as Adjutant 2 Squadron in Italy and in Sicily. Adjutant 2 Squadron in the Korean War. In 1974, he acted as Director General Personnel. Chief of Staff Personnel from 1 May 1974-30 Sep 1977.

Awards and decorations 
 
 
  Korea Medal
 
 
 
 
 
 
  United Nations Service Medal for Korea 
  Korean War Service Medal
  Order of Military Merit (Korea) 2nd class

References

 

1916 births
Possibly living people
South African Air Force generals
South African generals
South African military personnel of the Korean War